Shri Parsadi Lal Meena (born 1 February 1951) is an Indian politician and currently serving as the Cabinet Minister of Health & State Excise in Ashok Gehlot ministry and also member of 8th, 9th, 10th, 11th, 13th and 15th Legislative Assembly of Rajasthan. He also served as  Minister of Cooperative and Food Supply for two terms (1998–2003) and (2008–2013). And currently he represents Lalsot (Assembly constituency) as a member of Indian National Congress.

Early life and education
Shri Parsadi Lal Meena was born 1 February 1951 in Mandawari village in Lalsot tehsil of Dausa district of Rajasthan to his father Devilal Meena. He married Mishri Devi Meena. In 1967–68, he attended Government Higher Secondary School, Gangapur City and attained Intermediate Certificate.

Political career
Shri Parsadi Lal Meena was MLA for six terms from Lalsot Assembly as a member of Indian National Congress. From 1985 to 2003, he won four times continuously. In 1998, he was appointed Minister of Cooperative in Government of Rajasthan.

In 13th Legislative Assembly of Rajasthan (2008) elections, he was elected for a fifth time MLA as an Independent candidate defeating Babu Lal Dhanaka (Samajwadi Party) by a margin of 17,005 votes. After being elected MLA he again joined Indian National Congress and was appointed second time Minister of Cooperative and Food Supply (2008–2013) in Government of Rajasthan.

In 14th Legislative Assembly of Rajasthan (2013) elections, he again contested from Lalsot Assembly but lost to Kirodi Lal Meena (National People's Party (India)) by a lowest margin in 2013 Rajasthan Assembly election, only 491 votes.

In 15th Legislative Assembly of Rajasthan (2018) elections, he was elected Member of Legislative Assembly of Lalsot defeating BJP candidate Ram Bilas by a margin of 9,074 votes, and again appointed Cabinet Minister of Industries and State Enterprises in Ashok Gehlot ministry.

Posts held
1985–1990, Member of Legislative Assembly in 8th Legislative Assembly of Rajasthan. (First term) 
1990–1993, Member of Legislative Assembly in 9th Legislative Assembly of Rajasthan. (Second term) 
1993–1998, Member of Legislative Assembly in 10th Legislative Assembly of Rajasthan. (Third term) 
1998–2003, Member of Legislative Assembly in 11th Legislative Assembly of Rajasthan. (Fourth term) 
Cabinet Minister of Cooperative in First Ashok Gehlot ministry.
2008–2013, Member of Legislative Assembly in 13th Legislative Assembly of Rajasthan. (Fifth term) 
Cabinet Minister of Cooperative and food supply in Second Ashok Gehlot ministry.
2018–present, Member of Legislative Assembly in 15th Legislative Assembly of Rajasthan. (Sixth term) 
Cabinet Minister of Industries and State Enterprises in Third Ashok Gehlot ministry.

References

Indian National Congress politicians
1951 births
Living people
Rajasthani politicians
People from Dausa district
Rajasthan MLAs 2018–2023